Headquarters is an unincorporated community in Clearwater County, Idaho, United States.

History
A company town of Potlatch Corp., it was originally established as a fire protection station in 1906. Headquarters was the northeastern terminus of the Camas Prairie Railroad.

Headquarters' population was estimated at 300 in 1960.

The closure of lumber mills in the area in the 1980s and 1990s eliminated many jobs and severely impacted its population.

Climate
According to the Köppen climate classification system, Grangeville qualifies as having a dry-summer humid continental climate (Köppen Dsb).

References

Unincorporated communities in Clearwater County, Idaho
Unincorporated communities in Idaho
Company towns in Idaho